Paavo Vaskio (March 1, 1931 – September 26, 2012) was a Finnish sprint canoer who competed in the early 1960s. He was eliminated in the semifinals of the K-1 4 × 500 m event at the 1960 Summer Olympics in Rome. He was born in Helsinki and died in Espoo.

References
Paavo Vaskio's profile at Sports Reference.com

1931 births
2012 deaths
Sportspeople from Helsinki
Canoeists at the 1960 Summer Olympics
Finnish male canoeists
Olympic canoeists of Finland